Villa Licenciado Jesús Terán, known among its inhabitants as Calvillito, is a locale in the state of Aguascalientes. It is located 8 miles southeast of the city of Aguascalientes and has a population of 4,481.

External links

References

Populated places in Aguascalientes